Swissair AG/S.A. (German: Schweizerische Luftverkehr-AG; French: S.A. Suisse pour la Navigation Aérienne) was the national airline of Switzerland between its founding in 1931 and bankruptcy in 2002.

It was formed from a merger between Balair and Ad Astra Aero (To the Stars). For most of its 71 years, Swissair was one of the major international airlines and known as the "Flying Bank" due to its financial stability, causing it to be regarded as a Swiss national symbol and icon. It was headquartered at Zürich Airport, Kloten.

In 1997 the Swissair Group was renamed SAirGroup (although it was again renamed Swissair Group in 2001), with four subdivisions: SAirlines (to which Swissair, regional subsidiaries Crossair and Belair, and leasing subsidiary FlightLease belonged), SAirServices, SAirLogistics, and SAirRelations.

By the late 1990s, Swissair was burdened by over-expansion as a result of the controversial "Hunter Strategy". The crash of Swissair Flight 111 in 1998, which killed all 229 people on board, generated a costly lawsuit and negative publicity for the airline.  After the economic downturn following the September 11 attacks, Swissair's assets dramatically lost value, grounding the already-troubled airline in October 2001. The airline was later revived and kept alive until 31 March 2002 by the Swiss Federal government. The final Swissair flight landed in Zürich on 1 April 2002.

On 1 April 2002, a former regional subsidiary Crossair renamed itself Swiss International Air Lines and took over most of Swissair's routes, planes, and staff. Swissair Group still exists and is in the process of being liquidated. Swiss International Air Lines was taken over by the German airline Lufthansa in 2005.

History

Founding years 
On March 26, 1931, Swissair – Schweizerische Luftverkehr AG (English: Swissair – Swiss Air Transport) was founded through the fusion of the airlines Ad Astra Aero (founded in 1919) and Balair (1925). The founding fathers were Balz Zimmermann and the Swiss aviation pioneer Walter Mittelholzer. In contrast to other airlines, it did not receive support from the government. The name "Swissair" was the proposal of Dr. Alphonse Ehinger, president of the directorial board of the Balair, although "Swissair" was first deemed "un-Swiss". In the first operational year, 64 people were employed including ten pilots, seven radio operators, and eight mechanics. In total, their planes offered 85 seats, and operation was maintained only from March to October.

On April 17, 1932, Swissair bought two Lockheed Orions, making them the second European airline to use American planes, after the Czechoslovak operator CSA purchased a Ford Trimotor in 1930. The Orion was the fastest commercial airplane of its time and was put to use on the "Express line", Zurich-Munich-Vienna. This led Lufthansa to ask Heinkel for a model that could top Orion's speed, leading to the Heinkel He 70. The first trans-Alpine route was introduced in 1933: Zurich-Milan.

For the first time in Europe, flight attendants were employed aboard the Curtiss Condor beginning in 1934. Nelly Diener, the first flight attendant in Europe, became world-famous. She was killed after just 79 flights in a crash near Wurmlingen, Germany, on July 27, 1934. The cause of the crash was material fatigue.

In 1936, Douglas DC-2s were acquired and London was added to the route network. In 1937, the bigger Douglas DC-3 was bought. In the same year, both founding fathers died: Walter Mittelholzer during mountaineering in the Steiermark, Austria, and Balz Zimmermann succumbed to an infectious disease.

On August 27, 1939, days before World War II broke out, the airspace over Germany and France was closed. Swissair was forced to suspend service to Amsterdam, Paris, and London. Two days later, the Swissair service was closed completely. Of 180 employees, 131 had to serve in the army. Despite the war, some routes were re-introduced, such as Munich, Berlin, Rome, and Barcelona. In 1940, an invasion of Switzerland was feared, and Swissair moved their operations to the Magadino plains in Ticino. Operations were suspended in August 1944, when a Swissair DC-2 was destroyed in Stuttgart during an American bombing raid.

On July 30, 1945, Swissair was able to resume commercial aviation.

Ascension 

In 1947 the rise of shareholder capital to 20 million Swiss francs enabled long-haul flights to New York, South Africa, and South America with Douglas DC-4s. The modern Convair 240, the first Swissair plane with a pressurized cabin, was used for short- and medium-range flights from late 1948. The first Swissair DC-4 flight to New York was routed via Shannon, Ireland, and Stephenville, Newfoundland, on May 2, 1947, although it ended in Washington, D.C., due to fog at New York's LaGuardia Airport. The total elapsed time was 20 hours and 55 minutes.

The public, including the federal government, the states of Switzerland (Cantons), municipalities, the Swiss Federal Railways, and the Swiss postal services took over 30.6% of the shares and enabled Swissair to get a credit of 15 million Swiss Francs to purchase the airline's first two Douglas DC-6B airliners for delivery in 1951. By that act, Swissair became the national flag carrier of Switzerland. The new pressurized aircraft was to replace the DC-4 on transatlantic routes.

In 1948, the airport in Dübendorf, which served as the base of Swissair, was relocated to Zurich-Kloten. Military aviation continued in Dübendorf. The next year Swissair plunged into a financial crisis due to a sudden devaluation of the British pound because fares, except traffic to the United States, were calculated in British currency. At that time, the traffic to England made up 40 percent of Swissair's revenue.

In June 1950, Walter Berchtold, manager of Swiss Federal Railways, was elected to the directorial board of Swissair and served as the director. In 1971, he created the corporate culture of Swissair. He grasped the importance of corporate image and corporate identity, and after the example of BOAC's "Speedbird", he introduced the arrow-shaped Swissair logo. Giving flight personnel a distinct uniform was also an important move. At the time, flight attendants' uniforms resembled the gray-blue ones of the Swiss Women's Army Corps, so Berchtold introduced ones in a modish marine blue, and Swissair initiated a veritable fashion competition among European airlines.

In 1952, the cabin layout on northern trans-Atlantic routes was changed to one with a first and a tourist class. The first class had comfortable chairs in which one could sleep, given the name "Slumberettes". Those sleeping chairs were soon succeeded by beds, modeled after the U.S. Pullman railway cars. Two adjacent seats were moved toward each other and formed a lower berth. The wall panel could be folded downward, forming the upper berth in which the other person could sleep. A year later, tourist class was introduced on European flights.

In 1953 Swissair, with the city of Basel, founded a charter company called Balair, reusing the name of one of its predecessors, a company that initially used older Swissair aircraft to fly to holiday destinations.

As the first European customer, Swissair bought the Douglas DC-7C which enabled the company to provide non-stop flights to the United States. For shorter-range routes, the Convair Metropolitan was used.

In 1957, the Far East was added to the route network. Direct flights to Tokyo had intermediate stops in Athens, Karachi, Bombay, Bangkok and Manila. In that same year, Swissair helped Aristotle Onassis form the new Greek airline, Olympic Airways.

While competitors first looked at turboprop airplanes to replace their piston-engined craft, Swissair introduced jet airplanes. Together with SAS, Swissair bought Douglas DC-8s, which were delivered beginning in 1960. For medium- and short-range routes the Sud Aviation Caravelle was purchased. The aircraft were maintained in concert with SAS, and manuals for operation and maintenance were co-written.
 

Swissair was one of the few companies to buy Convair 990 "Coronado" aircraft -in 1962- for its medium- and long-range routes. Although the aircraft did not initially fulfill contractual specifications, they were liked by employees and customers. They operated on the airline's routes to South America, West Africa, and the Middle and Far East.

1966 saw the introduction of the Douglas DC-9. That aircraft became the backbone of the short- and medium-range routes, and, after convincing Douglas, on behalf of Swissair the Douglas Corporation offered a stretched variant: the DC-9-32. For the first time, Swissair was the launch customer of an aircraft type.

In 1971, Armin Baltensweiler took over as the president of the directorial board and ran the enterprise for over two decades. In the same year, the first Boeing 747-200 jumbo jet was acquired, and in the next year, the first McDonnell Douglas DC-10-30 followed. Both types shaped the long-haul fleet until the 1990s. Again, the specifications of both aircraft were developed in collaboration with SAS. Also in 1972, Switzerland introduced a prohibition of night flights, which led to the cessation of cheaper night fares.

In 1973, the company struggled with severe turbulence: currency crisis, collective chaos, an air traffic controllers' strike, the October War and the first oil crisis were weathered without too much damage. In that same year, the regional representative of Swissair in Buenos Aires was kidnapped by a revolutionary group. After 38 days in captivity, he was released after the payment of a CHF 12.4 million ransom. The airline also phased out the CV-990s during that time.

Swissair was the second European airline to offer a service to the People's Republic of China, introducing service to Beijing and Shanghai in 1975. In the same year, Swissair was the launch customer for the DC-9-51. In 1977, Swissair was the launch customer for the third DC-9 type, the DC-9-81 variant, now called the MD-80. Armin Baltensweiler had traveled to a meeting of the McDonnell-Douglas directorial board in St. Louis to convince them to further stretch the fuselage of the DC-9-51. Baltensweiler was called the “Father of the MD-80". In 1979, Swissair was the first company to order the Airbus A310-200, and the jumbo jet variant with a stretched upper deck, the Boeing 747-300. Also, the Fokker 100 short-range aircraft and the three-engined MD-11 were aircraft for which Swissair was the launch customer. 1983 saw the replacement of the older DC-9s with MD-83s.

Since the 1960s, Swissair had been a world leader in the development of cargo reservation systems (CRS). PARS and CARIDO were examples of booking passenger seats and freight space.

"The flying bank" 

After the 1960s, air traffic increased quickly and allowed many airlines – many of which were quasi-monopolists on their routes – to yield high revenues. Especially Swissair profited from its excellent reputation as a quality airline and from the fact that the political neutrality of Switzerland allowed the company to fly to exotic, but lucrative destinations in Africa and the Middle East. In geographic terms, the central position of Switzerland in Europe helped it to generate revenue from transfer passengers. By the early 1970s, Swissair was thus called "The flying bank", appealing to the large hidden assets and the huge liquidity Swissair had. Second, the "flying bank" was the designation for a corporate group that cared more about financial management than about flying airplanes.

With the beginning of deregulation and liberalization, airlines felt growing financial pressure. In 1978, Moritz Suter founded a regional airline named Crossair, which put Swissair under additional stress. To counter these changes, Swissair invested their large financial reserves into takeovers and into flight-related trades like baggage handling, catering, aircraft maintenance, and duty-free stores. This strategy diversified economic risks at the expense of the core business of Swissair – commercial aviation.

It started the Swissôtel hotel chain in 1981.

Concentration 

Regarding the further liberalization of Europe's airline market, Swissair focused more on commercial aviation and extended its partnerships. As the first European airline, Swissair signed in 1989 a cooperation treaty with Delta Air Lines and Singapore Airlines to form the alliance "Global Excellence". In 1990, together with SAS, Austrian Airlines and Finnair, the "European Quality Alliance" was founded. The latter alliance was later renamed to "Qualiflyer".
Because of the weak economy, the Gulf War and its aftermath, and rising operational costs, many airlines lost money in 1990 and 1991. Additionally, ongoing liberalization of the industry strengthened the competition. Consequently, Swissair lost 99 million Swiss Francs in the first half-year and was unable to pay dividends to its shareholders. In the years 1991 and 1992, Swissair had to dissolve financial reserves to cushion the losses from the commercial aviation sector.

On January 1, 1991, commercial aviation in Europe was completely liberalized and the existing capacities led to aggressive competition among the airlines. In a national referendum on December 6, 1992, Swiss citizens rejected taking part in the European Economic Area, EEA. This referendum was a significant disservice to Swissair, an airline with a minute domestic market: Its planes were not allowed to take up passengers during intermediate landings in EEA countries (e.g., Zurich – Frankfurt – New York), and Swissair was not allowed to offer tickets for sections that fully lie in EEA member countries (e.g., Zurich – Frankfurt – Paris).

See also freedoms of the air.

Like other airlines of smaller countries, Swissair now was under significant pressure. More and more national airlines affiliated themselves with airline alliances to maintain a worldwide market presence. But to be interesting for American alliance partners, an airline must have a critical size in terms of passenger numbers. To meet that goal, in 1993 an alliance between Swissair, KLM, SAS, and Austrian Airlines was proposed. This project bore the name "Alcazar" to create a single Central European airline. But in various countries, this project was criticized. In Switzerland itself, it was thought that the huge financial assets were too precious to merge Swissair with the other airlines.

Hunter Strategy

In the late 1980s, as well as throughout the early 1990s, Swissair tried to merge with Air France, Lufthansa, and British Airways to get access to a wider European market. Finally, after deregulation, Swissair tried to expand beyond its home Swiss market; after the Alcazar project was canceled, Swissair hoped to be a major force in European aviation.

In the 1990s Swissair initiated the disastrous “Hunter Strategy”, a major expansion programme devised by the consulting firm McKinsey & Co. Using this strategy, Swissair aimed to grow its market share through the acquisition of small airlines rather than entering into alliance agreements. Swissair decided to acquire 49.5 percent of the very successful Italian charter airline Air Europe, the unprofitable Belgian flag carrier, Sabena, and significant stakes in the carriers Air Liberté, AOM, Air Littoral, Volare, LOT, Turkish Airlines, South African Airways, Portugália and LTU, and planned to acquire stakes in Aer Lingus, Finnair, Malév, as well as Brazilian carriers TAM and Transbrasil. By mid-2000, it was predicted that Swissair would lose between CHF 3.25 billion and 4.45 billion over the next three fiscal years. The management however maintained classical restructuring, the Board approved the reorganization of LTU for approximately CHF 500 million. Also, there were plans to take over Alitalia.

In the summer of 2000, CEO Philippe Bruggisser came under public pressure, as the press published the financial situation of the group. Swissair and Sabena were each losing one million francs per day, and another million were lost every day at LTU and the French investments. The Board for the first time began to consider scenarios for phasing out the existing participation in other airlines, as Swissair looked to withdraw from their foreign investments. In January 2001 Bruggisser was summarily dismissed. Moritz Suter, the founder of Crossair, was nominated as the new CEO of SAirLines and thus all Group airlines including Swissair. After only 44 days, Suter resigned.

In March 2001, two studies by consultants were presented to the Board, which showed the financial difficulties of SAirGroup. At this point, the Directors resigned, with only Mario Corti, former CFO of Nestlé, staying behind. The buying spree created a major cash flow crisis for parent company SAirGroup, and was exacerbated by the environment caused by the September 11 attacks. Unable to make payments to creditors on its large debt, and with the refusal of UBS AG to extend its line of credit, on 2 October 2001 the entire Swissair fleet was abruptly grounded. Many blamed UBS for the fiasco, causing demonstrators to take to the streets with signs referring to UBS chairman, Marcel Ospel as "Bin Ospel", in reference to al-Qaeda leader Osama bin Laden, and redefining the bank's acronym, "UBS" as the United Bandits of Switzerland.

Two large bridge loans from the Swiss government were required to finance the continuation of flight operations.  This notwithstanding, with the resumption of flight service, it was necessary for flight crews to carry large sums of cash to purchase fuel at foreign airports.

Grounding
On 1 October 2001, the public was informed, via a press conference, of the project "Phoenix" and announced that parts of the group sought a payment delay. However, the continuation of service was secured by the Swiss federal authorities, as they were willing to pay half of the loan.

2 October 2001 saw an increased necessity for strong liquidity, as all suppliers insisted on cash payments of outstanding invoices following the request for payment delay announced the day before. Cash reserves of Swissair filed on this day were barely sufficient to carry out the first morning flights. During the morning, fuel suppliers refused to fuel the waiting aircraft. Other accounts were consolidated on the one hand because of the prior termination of the cash pooling facility from the UBS, on the other hand, due to the threat of favoritism regarding debts. The banks refused a credit increase before the sales proceeded, and insisted on a formal referral validity of the sale agreement.

At 15:45, CEO Mario Corti announced a cessation of flight operations due to the security risks caused by the crossing of the Flight Duty Regulations. This led to the cancellation of over 230 flights, and thousands of passengers, as well as flight crews, being stranded around the world. Flight crew corporate credit cards were blocked by the banks, with some hotels expelling the crews, and having them return home at their own expense. Also, all tickets sold were voided.

Crossair shares were only reissued on the evening of 2 October due to the rewriting of Crossair shares, with their purchase price not arriving until the following day – the setting of flight operations – into the SAirLines account.

4 October 2001 saw demonstrations by former Swissair employees before the UBS presentation held in Glattbrugg, and the following day saw demonstrations in Bern's Federal Square.

At around the same time, SAirGroup's stake in Crossair was sold to the Swiss banks UBS and Credit Suisse. Furthermore, Crossair took over various assets of former Swissair, including its employees, aircraft, and most European routes. Swissair and the SAirGroup were handed over to the liquidation firm of Jürg Hoss Liquidators and ceased operations on 31 March 2002. Crossair was renamed Swiss International Air Lines, or Swiss for short, and took over Swissair's intercontinental routes on 1 April 2002, officially ending 71 years of Swissair Service.

Transition phase
On 5 October, commercial flights on most routes were gradually resumed thanks to a federal emergency loan of over CHF 450 million. This occurred, in part, to ensure Switzerland's continued accessibility as a business location, and to establish a basis for the creation of Swiss. By preventing the complete collapse of Swissair, the other airline-related businesses of the group were spared collapse.
 

Following another federal repayable funding commitment of one billion francs, each of the 26 long-haul aircraft (MD-11s and A330s) and 26 medium-haul aircraft (A321s, A320s and A319s) were able to be transferred to Crossair / Swiss at the end of the winter schedule of 2001/02. On Easter Monday, 1 April 2002, the last flight of Swissair, flight SR145 from São Paulo, landed in Zurich. A 71-year-long chapter of Swiss aviation history thus came to an end. Between 1931 and 2002, Swissair transported more than 260 million passengers. The SwissairGroup (the name change from SAirGroup to SwissairGroup was announced in 2001 but never officially implemented) still existed as 'SAirGroup in Nachlassstundung' (German: Swissair in Administration) for several years until all assets were liquidated, including a large auction where many of the remaining Swissair assets, such as historic items, were auctioned. Today, Gategourmet continues as a subsidiary under the parent firm Gate Group.

Factors behind collapse 
Like other airlines that flew to the United States, Swissair's operations and profitability were disrupted in the wake of the September 11, 2001 attacks.  As several politicians were amongst those included on Swissair's directors, commentators have pointed to potential conflicts of interest as fundamental to the demise of Swissair. Media have also suggested that the directorial board failed to oversee the actions of Philippe Bruggisser (Chief Operating Officer since 1996) and Eric Honegger (board member since 1993 and later board president), and that they left behind a convoluted corporate structure and financial commitments – among others a further purchase of 35.5 percent of Sabena's stocks – which would only come to light when Mario Corti was trying to save the airline.

The judiciary is continuing to examine why Swissair acquired counselling that supported the Hunter Strategy, and why Swissair continued to make certain payments despite nearing insolvency. Questions have also been raised about federal aid given to Swissair and the politicians involved. The highly competitive nature of the market during the business's final years also precipitated its demise: like subsidiary Sabena, Swissair fell victim to the competition of budget airlines such as Ryanair and EasyJet.

A BBC correspondent said regarding the collapse "Something did die in Switzerland that day: not just an airline but an image the Swiss had of themselves and, more importantly, of their business leaders" and "The Swiss financial community's reputation for good business sense was already seriously damaged by the Swissair disaster."

Due to continued civil proceedings, parts of the causes of the collapse of SAirGroup are subject to legal proceedings and have therefore not been legally clarified. The following causes are widely recognized as crucial factors:

The management underestimated the dangers and difficulties in acquisitions and investments of partially ailing airlines. So the Belgian Sabena and the German LTU were taken despite the significant capital requirements. Also, the investments in France (AOM, Air Liberté, and Air Littoral) required much capital restructuring. Sabena ultimately ceased operations, due to the aforementioned financial crisis.
The indebtedness created by an uncompromising and too little adapted to the realities of implementation, "Hunter strategy" and the lack of monitoring by the Board.
The terrorist attacks in the U.S. led to a slump in demand and consequently to an extreme tightening of liquidity.
An orderly transfer of operations at Crossair was denied by the failure to reach a bridging loan and the delayed transfer of the share purchase price.
Increasing competition from low-cost carriers such as Ryanair and EasyJet, caused Swissair to lose passenger revenues.
A full merger with Sabena was impossible due to Swissair's financial crisis.
A McDonnell-Douglas MD-11, operating Flight 111, crashed in 1998 killing everyone on board, and lowering customer confidence (see below)

Legacy
In 2002 the successor Swiss International Air Lines commenced operations.  First called Swiss Air Lines, this company was based on the former Crossair, and was a merger of Crossair and former Swissair employees, routes, and aircraft. The company Swissair continued to exist (in liquidation) but had no further assets. Due to legal problems with Swissair, the name had to be changed to Swiss International Air Lines.

Swiss took over 26 long-haul and 26 medium-haul aircraft from the defunct Swissair fleet and refurbished the liveries and interiors to turn it into the new Swiss fleet, together with the former Crossair Fleet consisting of Embraer 145, Saab 2000, MD-80 Series and Avro RJ. The remainder of the Swissair aircraft that were grounded and were not taken by Swiss were returned to their lessors.

After problems with the former Crossair pilot unions, who refused to accept different conditions than the former Swissair pilots within the same airline, a subsidiary called Swiss European Air Lines was founded which belongs 100% to Swiss International Air Lines.

In 2004, it appeared that Swiss was going to become a member of the Oneworld alliance. It had codeshares with Oneworld carriers British Airways,  American Airlines, Cathay Pacific, Qantas, Aer Lingus and Finnair, and held a strategic partnership and joint operation for all service to North America and AA-operated flights beyond U.S. gateways using American Airlines. Swiss started to terminate these codeshare agreements but did not terminate the AA alliance. A theory emerged that Swiss was planning to use its partnerships, the AA alliance, and its partnership with British Airways, a strong supportive member of Oneworld, to join Oneworld itself.

However, in 2005 Swiss was taken over by the German airline Lufthansa, the national airline of Germany. With the merger with Lufthansa, Swiss joined the Star Alliance in 2006, which Swissair planned to join before it failed. With this move, Swiss's frequent flyer club, Swiss TravelClub became part of Miles & More, which was originally the Lufthansa Group frequent flyer club. It acts as both airlines' frequent flyer programme, along with many other Lufthansa Group airlines.

Management trial 
The criminal trial began on 16 January 2007 in Bülach.  The entire Swissair management board stood facing criminal charges of mismanagement, false statements, and forgery of documents. Top defendants in the trial were Mario Corti, Philippe Bruggisser, George Schorderet, Jacqualyn Fouse, Eric Honegger, and Verena Spoerry. Corti, Honegger, and Spoerry entered statements proclaiming their innocence.

On 7 June 2007, the court in Bülach cleared the defendants of all criminal charges over the airline's 2001 bankruptcy.

Continued use of the "Swissair" brand
Swiss retains the rights to the "Swissair" name, whose value was estimated at more than 10 million Swiss francs in 2010. In order to prevent the trademark from becoming void through disuse, Swiss licensed it to Hopscotch Air, which operates a fleet of Cirrus SR22 planes in the United States, for use from 2010 to 2013. In Switzerland, the trademark is protected through its use by an aviation sports club, Sportfluggruppe Swissair.

Fleet

Last active fleet
Prior to its demise, the Swissair fleet consisted of the following aircraft:

Historic fleet 

In its 71 years of existence, Swissair operated the following aircraft:

Destinations

Asia
 
 Beijing - Beijing Capital International Airport
 Shanghai
 Shanghai Hongqiao International Airport (before 1999)
 Shanghai Pudong International Airport
 
 Hong Kong
 Hong Kong International Airport
 Kai Tak Airport (terminated due to airport closure)
 
 Delhi – Indira Gandhi International Airport
 Mumbai – Chhatrapati Shivaji Maharaj International Airport
 
 Tehran – Mehrabad International Airport
 
 Tel Aviv – Ben Gurion Airport
 
 Osaka – Kansai International Airport
 Tokyo
 Haneda Airport (before 1978)
 Narita International Airport
 
 Jakarta
 Kemayoran Airport (terminated due to airport closure)
 Soekarno–Hatta International Airport 
 
 Kuala Lumpur
 Subang International Airport
 Kuala Lumpur International Airport
 
 Muscat – Muscat International Airport
 
 Karachi – Jinnah International Airport 
 
 Manila – Ninoy Aquino International Airport
 
 Jeddah – King Abdulaziz International Airport
 Riyadh - King Khalid International Airport
 
 Singapore – Singapore Changi Airport
 
 Seoul – Gimpo International Airport
 
 Bangkok – Don Mueang International Airport
 
 Taipei – Chiang Kai-Shek International Airport (as Swissair Asia; airport reamed Taoyuan International Airport in 2006)
 
 Abu Dhabi – Abu Dhabi International Airport
 Dubai – Dubai International Airport
 
 Ho Chi Minh City – Tan Son Nhat International Airport

Africa
 
 Algiers – Houari Boumediene Airport
 
 Douala – Douala International Airport
 Yaoundé – Yaoundé Nsimalen International Airport
 
 Kinshasa – N'djili Airport
 
 Cairo – Cairo International Airport
 
 Malabo – Malabo International Airport
 
 Addis Ababa – Addis Ababa Bole International Airport
 
 Libreville – Libreville International Airport
 
 Banjul – Banjul International Airport
 
 Accra – Kotoka International Airport
 
 Abidjan – Port Bouet Airport
 
 Nairobi – Jomo Kenyatta International Airport
 
 Benghazi – Benina International Airport
 
 Monrovia – Roberts International Airport
 
 Bamako – Bamako–Sénou International Airport
 
 Casablanca – Mohammed V International Airport
 
 Lagos – Murtala Muhammed International Airport
 
 Brazzaville – Maya-Maya Airport
 
 Dakar – Léopold Sédar Senghor International Airport
 
 Cape Town – Cape Town International Airport
 Johannesburg – O. R. Tambo International Airport
 
 Khartoum – Khartoum International Airport
 
 Dar es Salaam – Julius Nyerere International Airport
 
 Tunis – Tunis–Carthage International Airport
 
 Harare – Robert Gabriel Mugabe International Airport

Europe
 
 Linz - Linz Airport
 Vienna – Vienna International Airport
 
 Brussels – Brussels Airport
 
 Larnaca – Larnaca International Airport
 
 Prague – Prague Ruzyně Airport
 
 Bordeaux – Bordeaux–Mérignac Airport
 Lyon – Lyon–Saint-Exupéry Airport
 Paris
 Charles de Gaulle Airport
 Orly Airport
 Strasbourg – Strasbourg Airport
 Toulouse – Toulouse–Blagnac Airport
 
 Berlin – Berlin Tegel Airport
 Düsseldorf – Düsseldorf Airport
 Frankfurt – Frankfurt Airport
 Hannover – Hannover Airport
 Munich
 Munich-Riem Airport (terminated due to airport closure)
 Munich Airport
 Nuremberg – Nuremberg Airport
 Stuttgart – Stuttgart Airport
 
 Athens – Ellinikon International Airport (until 2001) switched to Athens International Airport Eleftherios Venizelos
 Thessaloniki – Thessaloniki Airport
 
 Budapest – Budapest Ferihegy International Airport
 
 Bologna - Bologna Guglielmo Marconi Airport
 Florence - Florence Airport
 Milan – Milan Malpensa Airport
 Rome – Leonardo da Vinci–Fiumicino Airport
 Venice – Venice Marco Polo Airport
 
 Amsterdam – Amsterdam Airport Schiphol
 
 Oslo
 Oslo Fornebu Airport (terminated due to airport closure)
 Oslo Gardermoen Airport
 
 Kraków – Kraków John Paul II International Airport
 Warsaw – Warsaw Chopin Airport
 
 Lisbon – Lisbon Airport
 Porto – Porto Airport
 
 Moscow – Sheremetyevo International Airport
 Saint Petersburg – Pulkovo Airport
 
 Belgrade – Belgrade Nikola Tesla Airport
 
 Alicante – Alicante–Elche Miguel Hernández Airport
 Barcelona – Josep Tarradellas Barcelona–El Prat Airport
 Madrid – Adolfo Suárez Madrid–Barajas Airport
 
 Stockholm – Stockholm Arlanda Airport
 
 Bern – Bern Airport
 Geneva – Geneva Airport Hub
 Zürich – Zurich Airport Hub
  /  / 
 Basel, Mulhouse, Freiburg – EuroAirport Basel Mulhouse Freiburg Hub
 
 Istanbul – Istanbul Atatürk International Airport
 
 Kyiv – Boryspil International Airport
 
 London
 London City Airport
 London Gatwick International Airport
 London Heathrow International Airport
 Manchester – Manchester Airport

Americas
 
 Buenos Aires – Ministro Pistarini International Airport
 
 Rio de Janeiro – Rio de Janeiro/Galeão International Airport
 São Paulo – São Paulo/Guarulhos International Airport
 
 Montréal
 Montréal–Mirabel International Airport
 Montréal–Trudeau International Airport
 Toronto – Toronto Pearson International Airport 
 Vancouver - Vancouver International Airport
 
 Santiago – Arturo Merino Benítez International Airport
  
 Atlanta – Hartsfield–Jackson Atlanta International Airport
 Boston – Logan International Airport
 Chicago – O'Hare International Airport 
 Dallas/Fort Worth – Dallas/Fort Worth International Airport
 Los Angeles – Los Angeles International Airport
 New York City – John F. Kennedy International Airport
 Newark – Newark Liberty International Airport
 Miami – Miami International Airport
 San Francisco - San Francisco International Airport
 Seattle - Seattle–Tacoma International Airport
 Washington, D.C. – Washington Dulles International Airport
 
 Caracas – Simón Bolívar International Airport

Swissair Asia

Swissair Asia was formed to serve Taipei, Taiwan, within the Republic of China, while Swissair was maintaining service to the People's Republic of China.

Corporate affairs
Swissair's head office was on the grounds of Zurich Airport and in Kloten.

KSG, Architects G.Müller + G.Berger designed the final head office complex for the airline. It was in proximity to the main airport facilities and area freeways. The first phase of the building included offices for 1,600 workers, computer rooms, printing rooms, and 500-seat restaurant facilities. The second phase included an open-plan office room, another computer laboratory, and expansions of the restaurant facilities.

In the 1930s the head office was in the Dübendorf Aerodrome in Zürich.

Accidents and incidents 
Over the 71-year history of Swissair, there were eleven major incidents reported resulting in 414 fatalities.

Literature 
 Benedikt Meyer: Im Flug. Schweizer Airlines und ihre Passagiere, 1919–2002. Chronos, Zürich 2014, .

References

Bibliography

External links 

 Archive of Swissair.com
 "Swissair." Swiss International Air Lines
 Swissair Information Website.
 
 Swissair Imagefilm "Follow Me" (1967), Condor Films
 Overview of the complete Swissair fleet
 How the organisational culture of Swissair affected the demise

 
Swiss companies established in 1931
Airlines established in 1931
Airlines disestablished in 2002
Defunct airlines of Switzerland
Swiss companies disestablished in 2002
Companies based in the canton of Zürich